Millerovo is the name of several inhabited localities in Rostov Oblast, Russia.

Urban localities
Millerovo, Millerovsky District, Rostov Oblast, a town in Millerovsky District

Rural localities

Millerovo, Kuybyshevsky District, Rostov Oblast, a selo in Krinichno-Lugskoye Rural Settlement of Kuybyshevsky District

Airbase
Millerovo (air base), Millerovsky District, Rostov Oblast

See also
Millerovsky (disambiguation)